This table displays the top-rated primetime television series of the 1971–72 season as measured by Nielsen Media Research.

References

1971 in American television
1972 in American television
1971-related lists
1972-related lists
Lists of American television series